Ayman Ryad Saeed Almuflih (born 1962) is the Jordanian Minister of Social Development. He was appointed as minister on 12 October 2020.

References 

Living people
1962 births
Government ministers of Jordan
21st-century Jordanian politicians